Astylosternus rheophilus is a species of frog in the family Arthroleptidae. It is endemic to western Cameroon. Common name Cameroon Range night frog has been coined for it. Two subspecies are recognized:
 Astylosternus rheophilus rheophilus Amiet, 1978 "1977"
 Astylosternus rheophilus tchabalensis Amiet, 1978 "1977"

Habitats
It is typically associated with small streams in forest, or at higher altitudes (>2000 m), also along streams in montane grassland, sometimes bordered with trees. Astylosternus rheophilus tchabalensis is known with certainty only from Tchabal Nganha and occurs in relict gallery forests in a generally deforested area. Breeding takes place in streams.

Conservation status
Astylosternus rheophilus is a very common species. Although it tolerates some habitat modification, widespread habitat loss and degradation are threats to it. Chytridiomycosis might pose an additional threat, at least in situations where populations are already stressed. It occurs in the Bafut-Ngemba Forest Reserve.

References

rheophilus
Frogs of Africa
Amphibians of Cameroon
Endemic fauna of Cameroon
Amphibians described in 1978
Taxonomy articles created by Polbot
Taxa named by Jean-Louis Amiet
Fauna of the Cameroonian Highlands forests